Lisa Gottlieb is an American film, television director and college professor. She is best known for directing the 1985 film Just One of the Guys. She went on to direct the films Across the Moon (1995) starring Christina Applegate and Elizabeth Peña and Cadillac Ranch (1996) starring Christopher Lloyd and Suzy Amis.

Gottlieb is now an associate professor at the Ringling College of Art and Design. She taught filmmaking and directing at the University of Miami School of Communication, University of Southern California School of Cinema, and Columbia College Chicago. She holds a Master of Fine Arts degree in Creative Writing from Antioch University.

Credits
 Just One of the Guys (1985)
 Freddy's Nightmares (1988, 1 episode)
 Dream On (1990, 1 episode)
 Across the Moon (1995)
 Cadillac Ranch (1996)
 Boy Meets World (1998, 1 episode)

References

External links

American film directors
American television directors
Antioch College alumni
American women film directors
American women television directors
Living people
Place of birth missing (living people)
Year of birth missing (living people)
21st-century American women